"Temptation" is a stand-alone single released by English band New Order on Factory Records in 1982. The single reached number 29 on the UK Singles Chart.

Original release

The 7" version is a more structured version with a commercial synthpop feel; the 12" is more chaotic with the emphasis on electronic rhythms rather than melody. The 7" version plays at 33⅓ rpm to accommodate its length of around five and a half minutes. Both versions bear the same catalogue number "FAC 63" despite these differences.

The 12" versions of both "Temptation" and its B-side, "Hurt", appear on New Order's mopping-up EP 1981–1982, released a few months after the single itself.

Neither version mentioned the band's name on the sleeve; instead the song title and catalogue number FAC 63 were embossed into the cover.

The vocal track on the original 12" version features an audible "startled yelp" during the song's intro. Vocalist Bernard Sumner has since explained that the scream was from him due to bandmates thrusting a snowball down his shirt during recording.

Music video
In 2006 the song was interpreted in a video titled The Temptation of Victoria by filmmaker Michael Shamberg, who had directed a number of music videos for New Order. Victoria Bergsman of Swedish band The Concretes acted the role of the protagonist in the video. Set to the song's 1987 re-recording the film features a young woman in Paris who steals a vinyl copy of the song's original 12-inch release from a vintage record shop (the now defunct Bimbo Tower), along with a bouquet from a flower shop, before returning to her apartment. On arrival home she puts the flowers in a vase and the record on to a player, and begins dancing to its music. At this point the video shifts from black and white to full color, starting with the bouquet before quickly encompassing the whole scene. The film plays out with her dancing alone, absorbed in the rhythm of the music.

The storyline of the video may refer to Ian Curtis, the late frontman/singer of Joy Division, New Order's previous formation, who used to shoplift records.

The Temptation of Victoria was one of two videos that New Order commissioned Shamberg to direct in 2005, and is dedicated to the memory of film director Michael Powell.

Track listing

Other versions
The song was completely re-recorded and released on 1987 singles compilation Substance, sometimes known as "Temptation '87". This version is now one of New Order's best-known recordings, partly due to its appearance on the best-selling Trainspotting soundtrack; in the film the lyrics are sung by Diane while she's showering, heard very faintly in the background during breakfast not much later and again during the scene where Renton is locked in his room.

Later, after five years of inactivity, another new version of "Temptation" was recorded by the band in 1998. This recording is similar to the earlier 1987 version, but omits the long intro and a portion of the lyric beginning "Bolts from above...". This did not represent an official rejection of these elements, as they were retained in live performances (such as that recorded at the 1998 Reading Festival and later issued on the Australian 60 Miles an Hour EP). Running at 4:08, this version is known as "Temptation '98" and eventually saw official release on the Retro boxset.

"Temptation" also holds the record for the most played live song in their catalogue.

A different mix of "Temptation" appeared on the soundtrack for the 1986 film Something Wild. That version clocks in at 3:30. The song can also be heard in the background of The Perks of Being a Wallflower.

Remixes
 An updated remix of "Temptation" by CJ Bolland appears on some versions of the 1995 remix compilation The Rest of New Order.
 Another remix by Secret Machines was released as the b-side of the "Waiting For The Sirens' Call" single in September 2005.

Meaning
Introducing the song at a performance at the Zurich Volkshaus in 1984, Bernard Sumner told the audience, "This next song's called 'Temptation'. It's a story about long lost love."

Availability
Substance contains the 1987 re-recording. Singles contains the 7" version. The 2008 Collector's Edition of Movement contains the 7" and 12" version. The Factory Records: Communications 1978-92 boxset contains the 12" version. The 2019 Definitive Edition of Movement contains an alternate 7" mix.

Charts

References

1982 singles
New Order (band) songs
Songs written by Bernard Sumner
Songs written by Peter Hook
Songs written by Stephen Morris (musician)
Songs written by Gillian Gilbert
Factory Records singles
1981 songs
UK Independent Singles Chart number-one singles